Zeenath A. P. (born 29 December 1964) is an Indian actress and dubbing artist. She was a prominent supporting actress during the 1990s in the Malayalam film industry.

Background
Zeenath was born to Abu Achippuram and Fathima in Nilambur, Malappuram district. She had her primary education from Navodaya School Nilambur. She is theater artist turned movie actor. She shared Kerala State Film Award for Best Dubbing Artist in 2007 with her sister Hafsath for the movie Paradesi. She was married twice. She married Malayalam Drama director and producer K. T. Muhammed on 10 June 1981 but ended up in divorce. Together they have a son Jithin who is married to Saleena Salim. Then she married Anil Kumar and have a son Nithin Anil. She currently resides in Kochi.

Awards
 2007 - Kerala State Film Award for Best Dubbing Artist- Paradesi for Shwetha Menon
 2016 - CPC Cine Awards for Best Character Actress  - Alif

 Kerala State Television Award 
 1991 - Best Actress- Poovanpazham ( telefilm) by Vaikkom Muhammed Basheer
 2005 - Best Supporting Actress - Sulthanveedu (Serial)

 Kerala Film Critics Association Awards

 2020 - Special Jury Award for direction - Randam Naal

Filmography

As actor 

 Randaam Naal - {director/story/script too}
 Mysore 150 k
 Ammayi (Short film)
 2022 Rorschach as Satheeshan 's mother
 2022 Kochaal as Mariyamma
 2022 The Epitaph (Short film) as Rukhiyya
 2020 Halal Love Story as Rahim's wife
 2019 Arayakkadavil  
 2019 Virus as Dr.Akila's mother
 2017 Oru Visheshapetta Biriyani Kissa as Fathima
 2016 Shajahanum Pareekuttiyum as Prince's mother
 2015 Kanthari as Palarivattam Padmavathi
 2015 Alif as Aatta/Fathima's mother
 2015 Elanjikkavu P.O as Lakshmi's mother 
 2015 Aashamsakalode Anna as Sherly
 2015 Haram as Ameena's mother
 2015 Ente Cinema- The Movie Festival
 2014 Gunda as Jhansi Rani 
 2014 Bad Boys 
 2014 Parayan Baaki Vechathu as Emmanuel's mother
 2013 Isaac Newton S/O Philipose as Gracy
 2012 Bhoopadathil Illatha Oridam as Karthyayini
 2012 Josettante Hero as Annie
 2012 Naughty Professor as Neighbour
 2012 Veendum Kannur 
 2011 Indian Rupee as Jayaprkash's mother,Yashodha
 2011 Sevenes ... Arun's mother 
 2011 August 15 as College Principal
 2011 Koratty Pattanam Railway Gate as  Annie's mother
 2011 Vellaripravinte Changathi as Actress
 2011 The Train as Suhana's mother
 2011 Lucky Jokers as Parvathy Thampuratti
 2011 Krishna Rajapuram
 2010 Valiyangadi as Pareekutty's mother
 2010 Ringtone as Krishna's mother
 2010 Bodyguard as Mani Chechi
 2010 Senior Mandrake as Archive footage
 2010 Khilafath
 2009 Decent Parties as Sudheendran's mother
 2009 Kancheepurathe Kalyanam as Devanayagi
 2009 Samayam
 2008 Vilapangalkkappuram as Usman's sister
 2008 Malabar Wedding as Ilayamma
 2008 Kabadi Kabadi as Saraswathi
 2008 Gulmohar as Paulachan's Wife
 2008 Raman as Krishnan;s wife
 2007 Nasrani as Prisoner
 2007 Ali Bhai aa Amminiyamma
 2007 Paradesi as Sulekha
 2007 Sooryan as  Sooryan's sister
 2007 Anchil Oral Arjunan as Sathi
 2007 Nagaram as Dr Cicily
 2006 Kisan as Savithri
 2006 Pakal as Shantha
 2005 Pandippada as Bhuvanachandran's Mother
 2005 Chandrolsavam as Santha 
 2005 The Campus as Najeeb's mother
 2005 Daivanamathil as Anwar's mother
 2004 Mayilattam as Mythili's mother
 2004 Udayam as Bharathi
 2004 Mampazhakkalam
 2003 Mizhi Randilum as Vathsala Koshy
 2003 Pattalam as Malini
 2003 Chronic Bachelor as Bhama's mother
 2002 Pranyamanithooval as Balu's mother
 2002 Neelaakaasham Niraye as Unni's sister
 2002 Nandanam as Unniyamma's kin
 2000 Arayannegalude Veedu as Laila
 2001 Uthaman as Saramma
 2001 Soothradharan 
 2001 Korappan The Great
 2001 Raajapattam
 2000 Joker as Jameela
 2000 Mr.Buttlers as Sumathi
 2000 Ingane Oru Nilapakshi as Vijayan's mother
 1999 Crime File as Mother Superior
 1999 Friends as Lalitha
 1999 Pattabhishekam as Aadi Thampuran's wife
 1999 Gaandhiyan
 1999 Ezhupunna Tharakan
 1999 Garshom as Jameela
 1998 Dravidan as Rarichan's mother
 1998 Gloria Fernandes From U.S.A. as Alice
 1998 Grama Panchayath as Shantha
 1998 Meenathil Thalikettu as Sarada
 1998 Manthri Kochamma
 1998 Vismayam as Vathsalakumari 
 1998 Aanappara Achamma 
 1997 Ishtadanam as Selina
 1997 Ikkareyanente Manasam as Padmini
 1997 Killikurushiyile Kudumba Mela as Ananthan's wife
 1997 Kadhanayakan as Ammalu
 1997 Mannadiar Penninu Chenkotta Checkan as Leelamani
 1997 Superman as Bhavani 
 1997 The Good Boys as Gomathi Teacher
 1997 Junior Mandrake as Vishalakshi
 1996 Mr. Clean as Savithri
 1996 Hitler as Devarajan's wife
 1996 Swapna Lokathe Balabhaskaran as Sadasivan's wife
 1996 Aakeshathekkoru Kilivathil as Lalitha
 1996 Sathyabhaamaykkoru Pranayalekhanam as Subhadra
 1996 Devaragam as Arathi
 1996 April 19
 1995 Kakkakum Poochakkum Kalyanam as Mahalakshmi
 1995 Sipayi Lahala as Rajendran's mother
 1995 Kidilol Kidilam as Savithri
 1995 Sindoora Rekha as Rajalakshmi
 1995 Simhavalan Menon as Gomathi
 1995 Three Men Army as Subhashini
 1995 Tom & Jerry as Devaki 
 1995 Parvathy Parinayam as Subhadra
 1995 Ratholsavam as Seethamm's mother
 1995 Shashinaas as Beevi
 1995 Thovalapookkal as Lakshmi
 1995 Achan Raajaavu Appan Jethaavu as Sarasu
 1995 Bali as
 1995 Maanam Thelinjappol as
 1995 Aadhyathe Kanmani
 1994 Sagaram Sakshi as Nirmala's sister
 1994 Vishnu as Rajamma
 1994 Varaphalam as Anjali's mother
 1994 Ponthan Mada  as
 1994 Puthran
 1994 Njan Kodeeswaran
 1993 Magrib as Safia
 1993 Mithunam as Subhadra
 1993 Kulapathi as Thanku
 1993 Bandhukkal Sathrukkal as Kamalakshi amma
 1993 Koushalam as Rosy
 1993 Porutham as Vijayalakshmi
 1993 Samooham as Rajalekshmi's sister
 1993 Kabooliwala as Laila's mother
 1993 Sarovaram as Damu's wife
 1993 Ghazal as Amina Umma
 1993 Theeram Thedunna Thirakal
 1992 Kudumbasametham as Shyamala
 1992 Mahanagaram as Kalyani
 1992 Aayushkalam as Geetha
 1992 Ulsavamelam as Kanakaprabha's mother
 1992 Thiruthalvaadi as Parvathy
 1992 Makkalmaahaathmyam as Saraswathi Amma
 1992 Grihaprevesam as Shobha
 1992 Kaazhchakkppuram as Harikumar's Wife
 1992 Kavacham
 1992 Neelakurukkan
 1992 Ayalathe Adheham 
 1991 Godfather as Karthyani
 1991 Kilukkam as Schoolteacher
 1991 Ulladakkam as Reena
 1991 Dhanam as Lekshmi
 1988 Ore Thooval Pakshikal
 1987 Oridathu as Christian lady 
 1986 Hello My Dear Wrong Number
 1979 Ival Oru Naadodi
 1979 Anyarude Bhoomi
 1978 Chuvanna Vithukal
 1978 Mayoora Varnangal

As dubbing artist 
Paradesi-voice for Swetha Menon
Penpattanam-voice for Swetha Menon
Paleri Manikyam: Oru Pathirakolapathakathinte Katha-voice for Swetha Menon
Rani Padmini  - voice for Sajitha Madathil
 TBA - voice for Parvathi T.
 Alone as Sheela Varky

Television Serials
 Poovanpazham (Doordarshan)
 Bandhanam (Doordarshan)
 Punnakka Vikasana Corporation (Doordarshan)
 Ladies Hostel (Doordarshan)
 Kamandalam (Doordarshan)
 Bandhangal (Doordarshan)
 Paying Guest (Doordarshan)
 Sultanveedu (Kairali TV)
 Ragardram (Doordarshan)
 Aatma (Kairali TV) - Producer also
Shanghupushpam (Asianet)
 Kadamattathu Kathanar (Asianet)
 Sooryaputhri (Asianet)
 Sindoorakuruvi (Surya TV)
 Nizhalukal (Asianet)
 Kanal Kireedam (Asianet)
 Swantham Malootty (Surya TV)
 Pavithra Bhandham (Surya TV)
 Parinayam (Mazhavil Manorama)
 Bhagyadevatha (Mazhavil Manorama)
 Bandhuvaru Sathruvaru (Mazhavil Manorama)
 Jagritha (Amrita TV)
CBI Diary(Mazhavil Manorama)
Thenum Vayambum (Surya TV)
 Dany's (Goodness TV) - Telefilm as Mary
Santhwanam (Asianet)

Dramas
 Snehabandham
 Khafar
 Srishti
 Swantham Lekhakan
 Vriddha

TV Shows
 Pularkkalam
 Sarigama
 Smart Show
 Annie's Kitchen
 Annorikkal
 Ruchibhedam
 Yo Yo Krishnanum Yasodamaarum
 Red Carpet

References

External links

 Zeenath at MSI

Living people
1964 births
Kerala State Film Award winners
Actresses in Malayalam cinema
Actresses from Kerala
Indian film actresses
People from Malappuram district
Actresses in Malayalam theatre
Indian stage actresses
Indian television actresses
Actresses in Hindi television
Actresses in Malayalam television
20th-century Indian actresses
21st-century Indian actresses
Kerala State Television Award winners
Indian voice actresses